Cody Lee Nickson (born April 13, 1985) is an American reality television personality, best known for competing in Big Brother 19 and winning The Amazing Race 30 with his then fiancée Jessica Graf. Previously, Nickson served in the United States Air Force and United States Marine Corps.

Early life and background 
Nickson was born in Lake Mills, Iowa and later resided in Plano, Texas. His mother is Darcy Nickson and he has a daughter named Paisley Nickson. Before Big Brother he joined the United States Air Force at the age of 17. He served as a 2M0X2 and 1N0X1 in the Air Force before enlisting in the Marines as an 0311 at the age of 23. He has also served combat tours in the Iraq and Afghanistan wars. Nickson graduated from Collin College with an associate degree in business management.

Military

Nickson initially served in the United States Air Force, but would later transfer into the Marine Corps. After the completion of bootcamp and infantry school, Nickson was assigned to 3rd Battalion, 9th Marines where he would serve as a 0311 Rifleman in combat deployments to Iraq and Afghanistan. Nickson received a commendation for his service. In 2012, Nickson received an Honorable Discharge.

Television

Big Brother

Big Brother 19 
Nickson appeared on 19th season of Big Brother. He began a showmance with fellow contestant Jessica Graf. On Day 1, he won the safety competition after Paul did not choose him as one of the 8 HouseGuests to be awarded immunity. He won Head of Household later that week, becoming the first HOH of the season. He nominated Megan and Jillian for eviction. On Day 9, he had to name a replacement nominee and picked Alex after Megan self-evicted herself from the game. After Alex won POV and took herself off the block he tried to nominate Paul. However, Paul revealed his Pendant of Protection, leaving Nickson to nominate Christmas instead. During week 2 Paul won HOH as well as Power of Veto and chose Nickson as a replacement nominee after saving Josh his previous nominee from the block. He endured the Ve-toad curse temptation after Christmas accepted the Temptation offer voted by America. He was evicted from the house on Day 23. Nickson later returned to the house after winning three rounds of the Battle Back Showdown during week 4. During week 5 Paul nominated Cody for eviction alongside Jessica but she used the Halting Hex saving them both from eviction. He won the second Temptation Competition the next week and became safe. He was named as a replacement nominee by Alex during week 7. He was evicted on day 58 and became the first member of the Jury. He voted for Josh to win Big Brother and won America's Favorite HouseGuest with a prize of $25,000.

Big Brother 20 
Nickson, alongside Graf appeared on Big Brother 20 to host the second POV competition.

The Amazing Race 
Nickson and Graf also participated in the 30th season of the U.S. television series The Amazing Race. They later became the winners of the season and took home the $1,000,000 prize along with a $5,000 prize they won earlier during the season, becoming the first former Big Brother contestants to win the Amazing Race.

Personal life 
He became engaged to Jessica Graf on February 13, 2018. He has a daughter from a previous relationship. In September 2018, Nickson and Graf announced that they were expecting their first child together, and confirmed the following month that they'd be having a girl. Nickson and Graf got married on October 13, 2018. Their daughter was born on March 17 2019. In May 2020, Nickson and Graf announced that they were expecting their second child together. Their daughter was born on October 5, 2020.

Controversy
Nickson has been criticized for making transphobic remarks during his time on Big Brother 19. In response to criticism on social media, Nickson declined to apologize for his comments.  During the COVID-19 Pandemic, Nickson promoted his brand of coffee, using "Scamdemic" as a discount promo code. The term has been used by right wing opponents to suggest the pandemic lockdown was a conspiracy and  discredit the public health measures being taken by local and federal government.

Filmography

Television

Awards & recognitions

References 

1985 births
Big Brother (American TV series) contestants
Living people
People from Lake Mills, Iowa
People from Plano, Texas
Reality show winners
The Amazing Race (American TV series) contestants
United States Air Force airmen
United States Marines
Television personalities from Iowa
Television personalities from Texas